A second hand good is one purchased by or otherwise transferred to a second or later end-user.

Second hand may also refer to:

Films
 Second Hand (2005 film), a Romanian film
 Second Hand (2013 film), an Indian Telugu film

Music
 Second Hand (band), British progressive rock band
 Second Hand (album), 1991 album by Mark Heard
 Second Hand (Marcin Rozynek album), 2012 album by Marcin Rozynek
 Secondhand Serenade, a solo project of John Vesely (musician)
 "Second Hand", song by Bachman-Turner Overdrive from the album Not Fragile

Other
 Second hand (card player), the player who bids or plays second in a card game
 The hand measuring the passage of seconds on a clock face
 Second hand smoke, inhaled by passive smoking